The 1960 AFC Youth Championship was held in Malaya.

Teams
The following teams entered the tournament:

 
 
 
  (host)

Group stage

Group A

Group B

Third place match

Final

Goalscorers

7 goals
 Cho Yoon-Ok
6 goals
 Robert Choe
5 goals
 Tin Aung Tua
 Soetjipto Soentoro
 Chung Soon-Chung
 Hamid Ghani
4 goals
 Dirhamsjah
3 goals
 Ryuichi Sugiyama
 Takayuki Kuwata
 Cha Kyung-Bok
 Ahmad Taufik
 Chew Seng Thum
 Anurat Nanakorn
2 goals

 Hla Tay
 Dzulkifli
 Manan
 Zulkifli
 Ikuo Matsumoto
 T. Kawase
 Romeo Jaranilla
 Quah Kim Siak

1 goal

 Hla Kyi
 Tin Win
 Toe Aung
 Sobari
 Kim Duk-Joong
 Ahmad Dollah
 Radzi Sheikh Ahmad
 Benjamin Chen
 Lee Teng Yee
 N.K Chalor

External links
Results by RSSSF

AFC U-19 Championship
International association football competitions hosted by Malaysia
1960 in Asian football
1960 in Malayan sport
1960 in youth association football
March 1960 sports events in Asia
April 1960 sports events in Asia